DeepCon (also Deepcon) is an Italian science fiction, fantasy and horror fan convention, covering multiple (ideally all) entertainment forms and media (e.g.: film, television, literature, comics, music, computer), mixed with a dose of actual, real-world science.

History 

The last two decades of the twentieth century were a relatively difficult time for science fiction in Italy, regardless of medium. Thus DeepCon was conceived to promote its visibility and viability as a genre, as well as a general SF fan convention.

Collaborations were sought with television stations, distributors and authoring firms, both for promotion and for panels explaining the behind-the-scenes work needed in order to air or sell a TV show or a movie. By the same token, TV and film actors and crew were present at all of the past DeepCons: actors, make-up artists, pre-production and post-production crew, scriptwriters, and so on.

Literature was not neglected, either. For several years, the convention's organizing committee was entrusted by WorldSF Italia with running  (a convention for professionals) within DeepCon. Since then, publishers, translators, international artists and writers participate and roam the venue.

As a highlight, parent Italian fan club Deep Space One was awarded for 2009 by European Science Fiction Society the privilege of organizing Eurocon (a Europe-level convention), with guests from all over the continent.

By that time, the SF focus of the convention had already broadened to include fantasy and horror as well.

Since most attendees and even some guests had a strong interest in actual science, efforts were made to officially include scientific and quasi-scientific topics in the program: aeronautics, astronautics, astronomy, astrophysics, computer science, archaeology, the paranormal (both for and against). Members of ASI, NASA, Northrop, CICAP were guests multiple times.

Deepcon 21, originally planned for March 2020, had to be delayed, then canceled in compliance with nation-wide countermeasures against COVID-19. It was then rescheduled as DeepCon 21 + Eurocon 2021 + Italcon 47 for July 2021.

Typical features 

 Entertainment-related panels
 Real world-related panels
 Art exhibitions
 Dealers' room
 Mingling all convention long, often with the guests, too
 Charity auction
 EatCon (food- and drink-related attendee-driven sub-event)
 Gala dinner
 Costume contest
 Autograph signing sessions
 Sunbathing (rare, due to the unfavorable season)
 Spa (charged separately)
 Unplanned, impromptu extras

Typical topics 

 Anime
 Babylon 5
 Battlestar Galactica
 Birth of a character
 Birth of an actor
 Black holes and Einstein-Rosen bridges
 CGI
 Cartoons
 Comics writing
 Definition of "horror"
 Different lifestyles in different parts of our planet (and other planets)
 The Dragonriders of Pern
 Farscape
 The History of computing
 How to make yourselves up like you just lost a fight with the Hulk
 The ISS
 James Bolivar "Slippery Jim" DiGriz, the Stainless Steel Rat
 Literary translation
 Manga
 Nathan Never
 Space probe design
 Star Trek
 Star Wars
 Stargate
 UFO
 Nicolas Eymerich
 Video translation, language localisation, lip-synching and dubbing
 Wikipedia

Editions

References

External links 

 

Fantasy conventions
Horror conventions
Multigenre conventions
Science fiction conventions in Europe
Italian fan conventions
Annual events in Italy
March events
Recurring events established in 2000
Spring (season) events in Italy
Province of Frosinone